Norway was represented at the 1984 Summer Olympics in Los Angeles by the Norwegian Olympic Committee and Confederation of Sports. Norway returned to the Summer Games after participating in the American-led boycott of the 1980 Summer Olympics. 103 competitors, 84 men and 19 women, took part in 76 events in 17 sports.

Medalists

Archery

In the third appearance by the nation in the archery competition at the Olympics, Norway was again represented by only one man. He posted Norway's best ranking in Olympic archery history with the 23rd place.

Men's Individual Competition:
 Jan Roger Skyttesæter — 2.465 points (→ 23rd place)

Athletics

Men's Marathon
 Øyvind Dahl — 2:19:28 (→ 33rd place)
 Stig Roar Husby — did not finish (→ no ranking)

Women's Marathon
 Grete Waitz — 2:26:18 (→  Silver Medal)
 Ingrid Kristiansen — 2:27:34 (→ 4th place)
 Bente Moe — 2:40:52 (→ 26th place)

Men's Javelin Throw
 Per Erling Olsen
 Qualification — 87.76 metres
 Final — 78.98 metres (→ 9th place)

 Reidar Lorentzen
 Qualification — 76.62 metres (did not advance, 15th place)

Women's Javelin Throw
 Trine Hattestad
 Round 1 — 62.68 metres
 Final — 64.52 metres (→ 5th place)

Men's Discus Throw
 Knut Hjeltnes
 Round 1 — 60.80 metres (→ advanced to the final)
 Final — 65.28 metres (→ 4th place)

Men's Hammer Throw
 Tore Johnsen – Round 1, 65.72 metres (did not advance)

Men's Decathlon 
 Trond Skramstad 
 Final Result — 7579 points (→ 17th place)

Men's 20 km walk
 Erling Andersen — 1:25:42 (→ 8th place)
 
Men's 50 km walk
 Lars Ove Moen — 4:15:12 (→ 13th place)
 Erling Andersen — disqualified (→ no ranking)

Boxing

Men's Light-Welterweight
Javid Aslam

Men's Light-Middleweight
Simen Auseth

Men's Heavyweight
Magne Havnå

Canoeing

Cycling

Ten cyclists represented Norway in 1984.

Men's individual road race
 Dag Otto Lauritzen — +0:21 (→  Bronze Medal)
 Morten Sæther — +0:21 (→ 4th place)
 Atle Kvålsvoll — +6:48 (→ 20th place) 
 Hans Petter Ødegård — did not finish (→ no ranking)

Team time trial
 Dag Hopen
 Hans Petter Ødegård
 Arnstein Raunehaug
 Morten Sæther

1000m time trial
 Rolf Morgan Hansen

Women's individual road race
 Unni Larsen — 2:11:14 (→ 4th place)
 Nina Søby — 2:13:28 (→ 18th place)
 Hege Stendahl — 2:13:28 (→ 19th place)

Diving

Men's 3m springboard
Jon Grunde Vegard – 531.48 (→ did not advance)
Men's 10m platform
Jon Grunde Vegard – 494.67 (→ 11th place)
Women's 3m springboard
Tine Tollan – 419.55 (→ did not advance)
Women's 10m platform
Tine Tollan – 341.31 (→ 12th place)

Equestrianism

Fencing

Six fencers, all men, represented Norway in 1984.

Men's foil
 Jeppe Normann

Men's épée
 Nils Koppang
 Bård Vonen
 John Hugo Pedersen

Men's team épée
 Paal Frisvold, Nils Koppang, John Hugo Pedersen, Ivar Schjøtt, Bård Vonen

Football

Men's Team Competition
Preliminary Round (Group A)
 Norway – Chile 0-0
 Norway – France 1-2
 Norway – Qatar 2-0 
Quarterfinals
 Did not advance

Team Roster
 ( 1.) Erik Thorstvedt
 ( 2.) Svein Fjælberg
 ( 3.) Terje Kojedal
 ( 4.) Knut Torbjørn Eggen
 ( 5.) Trond Sirevåg
 ( 6.) Per Egil Ahlsen
 ( 7.) Per Edmund Mordt
 ( 8.) Kai Erik Herlovsen
 ( 9.) Stein Gran
 (10.) Tom Sundby
 (11.) Stein Kollshaugen
 (12.) Ola By Rise
 (13.) Joar Vaadal
 (14.) Egil Johansen
 (15.) Jan Berg
 (16.) André Krogsæter
 (17.) Arve Seland

Gymnastics

Judo

Men's Half-Lightweight

Alfredo Chinchilla

Rhythmic gymnastics

Rowing

Sailing

Shooting

Swimming

Men's 400m Freestyle 
Arne Borgstrøm
 Heat — 3:57.88
 B-Final — 3:57.46 (→ 13th place)

Men's 100m Breaststroke
Jan-Erick Olsen
 Heat — 1:05.43 (→ did not advance, 21st place)

Men's 200m Breaststroke
Jan-Erick Olsen
 Heat — 2:25.75 (→ did not advance, 25th place)

Men's 200m Individual Medley
Arne Borgstrøm
 Heat — 2:08.09
 B-Final — 2:08.03 (→ 14th place)

Men's 400m Individual Medley
Arne Borgstrøm
 Heat — 4:28.37
 B-Final — 4:28.20 (→ 11th place)

Women's 100m Backstroke
Lise Lotte Nylund
 Heat — DSQ (→ did not advance, no ranking)

Women's 200m Backstroke
Lise Lotte Nylund
 Heat — DNS (→ did not advance, no ranking)

Women's 200m Butterfly
Katrine Bomstad
 Heat — 2:19.46 (→ did not advance, 18th place)

Women's 200m Individual Medley
Katrine Bomstad
 Heat — 2:19.88
 Final — 2:20.48 (→ 8th place)

Beda Leirvaag
 Heat — DSQ (→ did not advance, no ranking)

Women's 400m Individual Medley
Katrine Bomstad
 Heat — 4:52.74
 Final — 4:53.28 (→ 8th place)

Beda Leirvaag
 Heat — DNS (→ did not advance, no ranking)

Wrestling

References

Nations at the 1984 Summer Olympics
1984
Summer Olympics